Anathagiri is a village and panchayat in Ranga Reddy district, Telangana, India. It falls under Vikarabad mandal.

About 
Ananthagiri hills is 5 km from Vikarabad city of Rangareddy. It is one of the dense forests in Telangana. Ananthagiri Temple is located in this forested area. It is the source of Musi river, which flows through Hyderabad.
It is one of the earliest habitat areas. Ancient caves, medieval fort structures and temple shows the antiquity of this area.

Tourism Attractions
Ananthagiri Hills
Anantha Padmanabha Swamy Temple

References

Villages in Ranga Reddy district